Herman ze German (2008-2020) was a small chain of fast food restaurants offering German sausage dishes. At its peak it comprised four locations in London as well as one in Birmingham and in addition operated a food truck in Lörrach, Germany.

The restaurants offered a small number of mostly meat based fast food dishes popular in Germany, such as Currywurst, Bockwurst or Schnitzel. They were offered with french fries, bread, coleslaw or sauerkraut as side dishes. The meat was imported from butchers in Southern Germany.

Niklas Levinsohn (Youtuber and Podcaster) worked 2013 at Herman ze German.

According to the owners, the brand was forced to close all its restaurants permanently as a result of the COVID-19 pandemic.

References

External links

 (video, 5 mins)

German-British culture
Defunct restaurants in the United Kingdom
Restaurants in London
Defunct German restaurants
German restaurants